Meloe is a genus of blister beetles commonly referred to as oil beetles. The name derives from their defensive strategy: when threatened by collectors or predators they release oily droplets of hemolymph from their joints (legs, neck, and antennae). This fluid is bright orange and contains cantharidin, a poisonous chemical compound. Wiping the chemical on skin can cause blistering and painful swelling of the skin. This defensive strategy is not exclusive to this genus; all meloids posses and exude cantharidin upon threat.

Morphology

Members of this genus are typically flightless, without functional wings, and shortened elytra. They are often iridescent blue, green, or black with pits/punctures on the elytra and thorax. The abdomen is usually bloated. Male antennae have kinks in some species which are shaped differently in different species.

Biology

They usually climb onto a flower head, and await a bee there. They will then attach themselves to the bee. If it is a male, they wait for mating with a female. They will switch to the female when this takes place. If the bee is a female, however, she will take them back to her nest unwittingly. Once in the nest, the larvae morphs into a grub-like "couch potato" and feeds upon all of the provisions and the larva. Next, they form a pupa and emerge in various seasons depending on the species. Each species of Meloe may attack only a single species or genus of bees. Some are generalists. Though sometimes considered parasitoids, it appears that in general, the Meloe larva consumes the bee larva along with its provisions, and can often survive on the provisions alone; thus they do not truly qualify for this designation (see Parasitoid for definition).

Upon surfacing from their underground lives as larvae, the ground-restricted adults spent much time walking clumsily around and sampling small plants, stopping to extensively feed on plants in the Ranunculaceae, the Ipomoaceae, and the Solanaceae. Though restricted to the ground as aforementioned they can climb plants and walls not far off the ground. Meloe have appetites which are virtually insatiable. They are almost always eating, and sometimes they are seen defecating at the same time. 

Mating is a ritual among Meloidae, it begins when a male walks on top of a female and releases chemical components through the kinks on the antennae, massaging her antennae and pulling them back. This serves to calm the female. Mating then occurs, with the male transferring his cantharidin to the female during this period and she coats her eggs with it.

Species
Arranged alphabetically.

References

External links
 

Meloidae
Tenebrionoidea genera